Contemporary Family Therapy is a peer-reviewed academic journal covering research on family therapy, focusing on recent applied practice and developments in theory and research that is published quarterly by  Springer Science+Business Media. The editor-in-chief is Rachel R. Tambling (University of Connecticut). Contemporary Family Therapy (COFT) presents the latest developments in research, practice, theory, and training in couple and family therapy. COFT publishes applied and basic research with implications for systemic theory, treatment, and policy. COFT appreciates a multidisciplinary approach, and welcomes manuscripts which address processes and outcomes in systemic treatment across modalities and within broader social contexts. The journal’s content is relevant to systemic therapy practitioners and researchers, as well as marriage and family therapists, family psychologists, clinical social workers, and social policy specialists. It was established in 1986.

Abstracting and indexing 
Contemporary Family Therapy is abstracted and indexed in Scopus and PsycINFO.

External links 
 

English-language journals
Family therapy journals
Springer Science+Business Media academic journals
Quarterly journals
Publications established in 1979